Nicholas James Miller (born 4 January 1970) is a British weather forecaster who is working for the BBC. He joined the team at the BBC Weather Centre in London in January 2007, and can now be seen presenting on BBC News, BBC World News, BBC Radio 4 and BBC One. He appears regularly on the BBC News at One the BBC News at Six and BBC News at Ten.

Early life
He was born in York, Yorkshire, and attended Nunthorpe Grammar School, then a selective school (until 1985), in York, later going to the University of Nottingham.

Career
In 2012 he was the reporter on a BBC One Inside Out Special about the drought. His report was networked across all regional versions of the programme. In December 2012 he also provided a networked report in a BBC One regional special shown in England, Wales and Northern Ireland about the weather of 2012.

He also reports for BBC News including a report on the 25th anniversary of the Great Storm in which he interviewed Michael Fish about his infamous broadcast.

Prior to joining the BBC national weather team he was a weather presenter on BBC South East Today. He presented weather bulletins for Kent and Sussex from October 2003 until January 2007.

Nick has also worked for BBC Local Radio across the UK including BBC Radio York, Lancashire, Nottingham and Southern Counties, and spent some time working as a weather forecaster in the United States from 1999–2003 at KRTV in Great Falls, Montana.

On 15 March 2013 Nick became the final weather forecaster to present the last full national weather forecast, from the iconic studio TC7, at BBC Television Centre in London, on the BBC News at Six bulletin, which was presented by newsreader Sophie Raworth.

He is also the weather forecaster on the Springwatch, Autumnwatch and Winterwatch nature programmes.

Personal life
He lives in South Bucks near Denham.

References

External links
 
  Nick Miller  BBC Weather Website

1970 births
Alumni of the University of Nottingham
Living people
BBC weather forecasters
BBC World News
People from Denham, Buckinghamshire
People from York